The 2023 season will be D.C. United's 28th in existence and their 28th consecutive season in the top division of American soccer, Major League Soccer. In addition to MLS, D.C. United will participate in the 2023 U.S. Open Cup and 2023 Leagues Cup, their first international club tournament since 2016. The season will be the first full season with Wayne Rooney as manager. The season covers the period from 1 November 2022 to 31 October 2023.

This will be the first season since 2008 where long-time United goalkeeper, Bill Hamid, will not be on the roster.

Background 

The 2022 season was a tumultuous season for United. The club finished at the bottom of the MLS table and saw the firing of their then-head coach, Hernán Losada early in the season, followed by their interim manager, Chad Ashton being removed from interim duties halfway through the season, prior to Wayne Rooney's arrival. The club set a record in the number of goals conceded 75 and the largest losses in club history, both to Philadelphia Union, a six-goal home loss, and a seven-goal away loss. Midseason acquisition, Taxiarchis Fountas lead United in goals during the season, scoring 12 goals in 21 appearances, being United's lone player selected for the 2022 MLS All-Star Game. Outside of MLS, United were eliminated in the fourth round proper of the U.S. Open Cup by their longtime rivals, the New York Red Bulls. 

The offseason saw Lucy Rushton fired as General Manager, and Soccer Director, Dave Kasper, demoted in his role.

Club

Team management

Roster

Non-competitive

Friendlies

Competitive

Major League Soccer

Standings

Eastern Conference

Overall table

Results summary

Results by matchday

Match results

U.S. Open Cup

Leagues Cup

East 2

Transfers

Transfers in

Transfers out

Loans in

Loan out

MLS SuperDraft picks

Statistics

Appearances and goals 
Numbers after plus-sign(+) denote appearances as a substitute.

|-

|-
!colspan="4"|Total
!2!!3!!2!!3!!0!!0!!0!!0!!0!!0

Top scorers 
{| class="wikitable" style="font-size: 100%; text-align: center;"
|-
! style="background:#000000; color:#FFFFFF; border:2px solid #E32526; width:35px;" scope="col"|Rank
! style="background:#000000; color:#FFFFFF; border:2px solid #E32526; width:35px;" scope="col"|Position
! style="background:#000000; color:#FFFFFF; border:2px solid #E32526; width:35px;" scope="col"|No.
! style="background:#000000; color:#FFFFFF; border:2px solid #E32526; width:140px;" scope="col"|Name
! style="background:#000000; color:#FFFFFF; border:2px solid #E32526; width:75px;" scope="col"|
! style="background:#000000; color:#FFFFFF; border:2px solid #E32526; width:75px;" scope="col"|
! style="background:#000000; color:#FFFFFF; border:2px solid #E32526; width:75px;" scope="col"|
! style="background:#000000; color:#FFFFFF; border:2px solid #E32526; width:75px;" scope="col"|Total
|-
|1 || FW || 20 ||align="left"|  Christian Benteke || 2 || 0 || 0 || 2
|-
|rowspan="4"| 2 || MF || 21 ||align="left"|  Ted Ku-DiPietro || 1 || 0 || 0 || 1
|-
| MF || 43 ||align="left"|  Mateusz Klich || 1 || 0 || 0 || 1
|-
| MF || 8 ||align="left"|  Chris Durkin || 1 || 0 || 0 || 1
|-
| DF || 15 ||align="left"|  Steve Birnbaum || 1 || 0 || 0 || 1
|-
!colspan="4"|Total
!6!!0!!0!!6

Top assists 

{| class="wikitable" style="font-size: 100%; text-align: center;"
|-
! style="background:#000000; color:#FFFFFF; border:2px solid #E32526; width:35px;" scope="col"|Rank
! style="background:#000000; color:#FFFFFF; border:2px solid #E32526; width:35px;" scope="col"|Position
! style="background:#000000; color:#FFFFFF; border:2px solid #E32526; width:35px;" scope="col"|No.
! style="background:#000000; color:#FFFFFF; border:2px solid #E32526; width:140px;" scope="col"|Name
! style="background:#000000; color:#FFFFFF; border:2px solid #E32526; width:75px;" scope="col"|
! style="background:#000000; color:#FFFFFF; border:2px solid #E32526; width:75px;" scope="col"|
! style="background:#000000; color:#FFFFFF; border:2px solid #E32526; width:75px;" scope="col"|
! style="background:#000000; color:#FFFFFF; border:2px solid #E32526; width:75px;" scope="col"|Total
|-
| 1 || DF || 5 ||align="left"|  Mohanad Jeahze || 2 || 0 || 0 || 2
|-
|rowspan="3"| 2 || MF || 6 ||align="left"|  Russell Canouse || 1 || 0 || 0 || 1
|-
| MF || 21 ||align="left"|  Ted Ku-DiPietro || 1 || 0 || 0 || 1
|-
| FW || 26 ||align="left"|  Kristian Fletcher || 1 || 0 || 0 || 1
|-
!colspan="4"|Total
!5!!0!!0!!5

References

External links 
 D.C. United

 

D.C. United seasons
Dc United
Dc United
2023 in sports in Washington, D.C.